Farhan Ahmed (born 31 October 1988) is a Pakistani-born cricketer who played for the United Arab Emirates national cricket team. He made his first-class debut for the United Arab Emirates against the Netherlands in the 2015–17 ICC Intercontinental Cup on 21 January 2016. He made his List A debut for the UAE against the Netherlands in the 2015–17 ICC World Cricket League Championship on 27 January 2016. He made his Twenty20 International debut against the Netherlands on 3 February 2016.

References

External links
 

1988 births
Living people
Emirati cricketers
United Arab Emirates Twenty20 International cricketers
Cricketers from Bahawalpur
Pakistani emigrants to the United Arab Emirates
Pakistani expatriate sportspeople in the United Arab Emirates